Glyptoscelis albicans is a species of leaf beetle. It is found in the southeastern United States.

References

Further reading

 

Eumolpinae
Articles created by Qbugbot
Beetles described in 1865
Taxa named by Joseph Sugar Baly
Beetles of the United States